Buxa is a village in the Alipurduar district of West Bengal within Buxa Tiger Reserve. It is known for the Buxa Fort.
It is situated in the dooars in north bengal and it is the critical corridor with assam and Bhutan. Buxa is the wettest place of West Bengal (550 cm).

References

Villages in Alipurduar district